Amy Jessica Marston  (born 1972) is an English actress on screen and in theatre. She is known for her roles as Sylvia Sands in The Hello Girls, as Deborah in Rome, and as Jenny Rawlinson in EastEnders.

film and television career
In 1996, Marston made her debut appearance on television in the mini-series Neverwhere, playing the role of Anasthesia for two episodes, in a cast which included Tamsin Greig and  Peter Capaldi. Between 1996 and 1998, she played Sylvia Sands for 16 episodes of The Hello Girls alongside Letitia Dean. 

In 2004, Marston played Priscilla Stanbury in the 4-part BBC miniseries He Knew He Was Right alongside Bill Nighy, Geoffrey Palmer and David Tennant. In 2007, she portrayed Deborah for six episodes of the historical drama Rome. 

In 2012, she appeared in the feature film Bel Ami in 2012, alongside Christina Ricci, Kristin Scott Thomas and Uma Thurman. She co-starred with Jamie Dornan in the 2014 TV mini-series New Worlds for three episodes. In 2016, she played the role of Jenny Rawlinson in EastEnders . In 2019 she appeared in The Current War, alongside Benedict Cumberbatch, Michael Shannon and Nicholas Hoult. In 2019, she appeared in an episode of the BBC soap opera Doctors as Shannon Wren.

Theatre career
Marston was nominated for an Offie Award in 2018, for 'Best female in a play' for her role as Sylvia Gellburg in Broken Glass at the Watford Palace Theatre.

Filmography

Stage

Awards and nominations

References

External links
AHA Actor profile on Amy Marston
IMDb Amy Marston

Living people
21st-century English actresses
English film actresses
English television actresses
Alumni of Bristol Old Vic Theatre School
1972 births